P. marginatum may refer to:

 Piper marginatum, the cake bush, Anesi wiwiri, marigold pepper, Ti Bombé in Creole or Hinojo, a plant species found in moist, shady spots in the Amazon rainforest in Surinam, French Guiana and Brazil
 Plasmodium marginatum, a parasite species
 Pterosperma marginatum, a green algae species

See also 
 Marginatum (disambiguation)